Derek Waugh (born October 13, 1971) came to Dalton State in 2012 as athletic director to start up the school's first four-year intercollegiate athletic program. Prior to coming to Dalton, Waugh was an assistant athletic director at Stetson University in DeLand, Florida. He spent most of his time at Stetson as the head men's basketball coach, where he took over the program in 2000 at the age of 29, which made him the youngest division I head coach in the country, and finished his career second in program history in all-time wins in 2011. He also ranks third all-time in wins in the Atlantic Sun Conference.

Prior to his career in athletics, Waugh was an attorney at the Atlanta firm of Schreeder, Wheeler and Flint. He attended law school at Wake Forest and completed his undergraduate degree at Furman University, where he was a first team all-conference basketball player and a GTE Division I Academic All-American in 1993.

College achievements

Throughout his career as a student athlete, he had several titles and accomplishments. He was awarded Southern Conference Freshman of the Year in 1990. Waugh helped lead the Furman program to its only Southern Conference Championship in the past 34 years in 1991. He was named GTE Division 1 Academic All-American and named First Team All-Southern Conference in 1993. Waugh graduated Furman as one of only four players to score 1,400 points and grab 800 rebounds in his career. Furman honored him as their Young Alumnus of the Year in 2000.

Adult career

Waugh started his career as an attorney at the Atlanta firm of Schreeder, Wheeler and Flint. He made between $65,000 and $70,000 right out of college. He worked at this firm for a year and a half. On the weekends he coached little league baseball and helped the 9-year-olds improve. His team, the Diamondbacks, made it to the league finals. 
Soon after, Waugh was offered the position of head coach at Stetson University in Florida after the coach Murray Arnold retired. This position made him the youngest Division 1 college basketball coach, at age 29. After he took over he coached the Hatters to 13 wins in their final 21 games in his first year. In 2012, Waugh was invited to become the athletic director at Dalton State College. He is responsible for starting DSC's first four-year intercollegiate athletic program. Currently there are ten sports at DSC consisting of; Men's Basketball, Golf, Cross Country, Tennis, Soccer and Competitive Cheer-leading. Including; Women's Tennis, Cross Country, Golf, Soccer, Volleyball and Competitive Cheer-leading.

Time at Dalton State

After becoming the athletic director at Dalton State College, Waugh focused heavily on getting the program off to a good start. During the press conference announcing his new position as DSC he is quoted saying, "I know basketball is a great spectator sport and has a fantastic history here, but the individual sports are the easiest to add," he said, "and this area is so immensely talented in so many sports." Currently the DSC Roadrunners Men's Basketball Team is enjoying their 2015 NAIA Division 1 Championship. Thanks in part to Waugh's influence in hiring staff and personal goal to help choose the best player possible.

References

1971 births
Living people
American men's basketball coaches
American men's basketball players
Basketball coaches from Georgia (U.S. state)
Basketball players from Atlanta
Furman Paladins men's basketball players
Stetson Hatters men's basketball coaches